Ennio Baiardi (6 May 1928 – 16 October 2014) was an Italian politician who served as Mayor of Vercelli (1975–1983) and as Senator for two legislatures (1983–1987, 1987–1992).

References

1928 births
2014 deaths
Mayors of Vercelli
Senators of Legislature IX of Italy
Senators of Legislature X of Italy
20th-century Italian politicians
Italian Communist Party politicians
Democratic Party of the Left politicians
People from Vercelli